Tuia is a surname. Notable people with the surname include:

Alessandro Tuia (born 1990), Italian footballer
Pio Tuia (born 1943), Tokelauan politician
Samuel Tuia (born 1986), French volleyball player
Tuanaitau F. Tuia (c.1920 – 2010), American Samoan politician
Valerie Saena Tuia, plant scientist from Samoa